Baburao Narasappa "Baboo" Nimal (15 March 1908 – 21 February 1998) was an Indian field hockey player who competed in the 1936 Summer Olympics. He was a member of the Indian team which won the gold medal at the 1936 Olympic Games. He played three (including the final) matches as a fullback.

External links
 
 
 
 

1908 births
1998 deaths
Field hockey players from Pune
Olympic field hockey players of India
Field hockey players at the 1936 Summer Olympics
Indian male field hockey players
Olympic gold medalists for India
Olympic medalists in field hockey
Medalists at the 1936 Summer Olympics